Johannes Rampf (February 2, 1931 in Bad Tölz, Germany – May 6, 2001) was a German ice hockey player. He participated at the 1956 Winter Olympics and 1960 Winter Olympics. He was inducted into the International Ice Hockey Federation Hall of Fame in 2001.

Biography
He played for the German national ice hockey team during the 1956 Winter Olympics when Germany competed as the Unified team of Germany and finished in 6th place over all. In the 1960 games, the team had the same result. He also played for the club team EC Bad Tolz in Germany.

Coaching
In the 1980 Winter Olympics, Hans Rampf coached the West German team throughout 5 games in the First Round. Although the team did not repeat the shock of the Bronze medal won by the 1976 Olympic team, they did have some good games, where they took on the USA team, which eventually won the gold medal and only lost 4-2 and against Norway where they won 10-4.

The team finished with a 1-4-0 record and finished overall in tenth place out of twelve, in front of Norway and Japan.

References

External links
 IIHF Hockey Hall of Fame bio

1931 births
2001 deaths
German ice hockey coaches
Germany men's national ice hockey team coaches
Ice hockey players at the 1956 Winter Olympics
Ice hockey players at the 1960 Winter Olympics
IIHF Hall of Fame inductees
Olympic ice hockey players of Germany
Olympic ice hockey players of the United Team of Germany
People from Bad Tölz
Sportspeople from Upper Bavaria